Oakham School is a cricket ground in Oakham, Rutland. Forming part of sports facilities of Oakham School, the ground dates from around 1821. First-class cricket was first played at Oakham School in the 1935 County Championship, with Leicestershire playing against Kent. Leicestershire used the ground as an outground on three more occasions prior to the Second World War. Following a gap of 62 years, first-class cricket returned to Oakham School in 2000, when Leicestershire played the 1999 County Champions Surrey. The ground has since been used intermittently as an outground for first-class matches by Leicestershire, with five matches played there since 2000. During the first decade of the 2000s, Leicestershire played nine List A one-day matches at the ground between 2001–08, before returning after a ten year gap when they played Lancashire in the 2018 Royal London One-Day Cup. In 2020, Leicestershire announced plans to revive the Oakham Cricket Festival and make it a permanent part of Leicestershire's county schedule.

Records
First-class
 Highest team total: 534 all out by Leicestershire v Derbyshire, 2004
 Lowest team total: 56 all out by Kent v Leicestershire, 1935
 Highest individual innings: 295* by Ali Brown for Surrey v Leicestershire, 2000
 Best bowling in an innings: 8–123 by Tich Freeman for Kent v Leicestershire, 1935
 Best bowling in a match: 11–106 by Frank Woolley, for Kent v Leicestershire, 1938

List A
 Highest team total: 299 for 5 by Nottinghamshire v Leicestershire, 2007
 Lowest team total: 137 all out by Leicestershire v Worcestershire, 2004
 Highest individual innings: 107 by Stephen Fleming for Nottinghamshire v Leicestershire, 2007
 Best bowling in an innings: 4–12 by Dinesh Mongia for Leicestershire v Somerset, 2005

See also
List of Leicestershire County Cricket Club grounds
List of cricket grounds in England and Wales

References

Oakham
Cricket grounds in Rutland
Leicestershire County Cricket Club